John Farquhar Lymburn (September 25, 1880 – November 25, 1969) was a Canadian politician who served as Attorney-General of Alberta from 1926 until 1935. Born and educated in Scotland, he came to Canada in 1911 and practiced law in Edmonton. In 1925, John Edward Brownlee became Premier of Alberta, and sought a lawyer without partisan affiliation to succeed him as attorney-general. Lymburn accepted the position, and was elected to the Legislative Assembly of Alberta in the 1926 election. As attorney-general, Lymburn took part in negotiations between the Alberta and federal governments over natural resource rights, prepared Alberta's submission in the Persons case, and played a minor role in the sex scandal that forced Brownlee from office. In the 1935 provincial election, Lymburn and all other United Farmers of Alberta candidates were defeated, as William Aberhart led the Social Credit League to victory. Lymburn made an unsuccessful attempt to return to the legislature in 1942, and briefly returned to prominence during the Bankers' Toadies incident, before dying in 1969.

Early life
Lymburn was born in Ayr, Scotland to William and Margaret (Farquhar) Lymburn. He attended Ayr Grammar School and Ayr Academy before studying law at Glasgow University. After graduating, he apprenticed with Dougall, Gouldie, and Douglas; he qualified as a solicitor in 1903.  In 1911 he emigrated to Canada, settling in Edmonton where he joined Short, Cross, and Biggar. Two years later, he co-founded Lymburn, Mackenzie, and Cooke (later renamed Lymburn, Reid, and Cobbledick).  In the interim, he had married fellow Scot Isabella Marguerite Clark on July 19, 1912. The couple had three daughters: Marguerite Dormer, Mary Doreen Farquhar, and Constance Clark.  John Lymburn was made King's Counsel in 1926.

Attorney-general
In 1925, attorney-general John Edward Brownlee succeeded Herbert Greenfield as the leader of the United Farmers of Alberta (UFA)'s provincial caucus and Premier of Alberta. Brownlee was the only lawyer in the UFA caucus, which was dominated by farmers. In appointing an attorney-general to replace himself, he looked outside his caucus and appointed Lymburn, in part because of his lack of affiliation with any provincial political party. By convention, all cabinet ministers, including attorneys-general, were expected to sit in the Legislative Assembly of Alberta. Accordingly, Lymburn ran in the 1926 provincial election in Edmonton as a UFA candidate, the first time that the overwhelmingly rural party had run a candidate in either of Alberta's two major cities. He finished first of eighteen candidates in Edmonton, and became one of Edmonton's five Members of the Legislative Assembly (MLAs).

As attorney-general, Lymburn was involved in many of the Brownlee government's most important initiatives. He was a major figure in securing the transfer of resource rights from the federal government to the Alberta government.  Once the Great Depression began to breed labour militancy, at Brownlee's request he prepared a list of known Communist leaders so that the government could take action to deport them.  When Alberta became the only province to support the appellants in the "Persons case", Lymburn was responsible for its submission.  He was also involved in scandal: the former head of the Liquor Investigation Bureau made allegations against him after Lymburn eliminated the Bureau to save money, though the charges had little effect either in the legal system or in the public eye.  During the John Brownlee sex scandal, in which Brownlee was sued for the seduction of a family friend, Lymburn became the focus of controversy after his department hired a private investigator to look into claims that a Liberal lawyer had offered a young woman money to "put Mr. Brownlee in such a position that Mrs. Brownlee could get a divorce".  Taking the stand during the trial, Lymburn stated that the investigation had been initiated not to aid in the premier's defence, but because the alleged solicitation was a criminal offence.  He noted further that Brownlee had insisted on refunding to the government the cost of the investigator.

When the scandal forced Brownlee's resignation as premier, Lymburn stayed on as attorney-general in the short-lived government of Richard Gavin Reid. The conservative Reid government was suffering damage to its popularity as a result of the Great Depression, and radical economic theories, most notably the version of social credit espoused by Calgary evangelist William Aberhart, were gaining currency among the public. The government's position was that Aberhart's proposals were beyond the legal authority of the provincial government, since they involved banking, which the Constitution of Canada makes a responsibility of the federal government. As attorney-general, Lymburn played a major role in defending this position. When the government brought social credit founder C. H. Douglas from the United Kingdom as an advisor, Lymburn provided him with a copy of one of Aberhart's speeches and asked him to critique it; Douglas concluded that Aberhart's proposals did not align with "Douglasite" social credit, and that many of them would not have the desired effect.

Later life
In the 1935 provincial election, the UFA was wiped out of the legislature by Aberhart's upstart Social Credit League. As historian Franklin Foster has noted, "it was an ironic footnote to the demise of the most politically successful farmers' group in history that the one UFA candidate who came closest to re-election was lawyer John Lymburn in the City of Edmonton."  After defeat, Lymburn remained active in community life as an elder in Edmonton's First Presbyterian Church, chairman of the Advisory Board of the Students' Christian Movement, chairman of the Board of Directors of the Beulah Home for unmarried mothers, and president of the Edmonton Scottish Society.  He was also a long-standing member of the Mayfair Golf and Country Club.  He was an aficionado of the work of fellow Ayrshire native Robbie Burns, whose poetry he could recite in Gaelic, and often spoke at Burns suppers.

Lymburn briefly re-entered the public eye in 1937, when he was named in a Social Credit-produced pamphlet as one of eight "Bankers' Toadies" who should be "exterminated"; Social Credit whip Joseph Unwin was convicted of criminal libel in relation to the pamphlet.  In 1942, Lymburn contested a by-election in Edmonton; he finished third of five candidates as Elmer Roper of the Cooperative Commonwealth Federation emerged victorious.

Marguerite Lymburn died in 1958.  John Lymburn died eleven years later, on November 25, 1969.

Electoral record

See also
Premiership of John Brownlee

References

Notes

1880 births
1969 deaths
Alumni of the University of Glasgow
Canadian Presbyterians
Lawyers in Alberta
People from Ayr
Scottish emigrants to Canada
Scottish Presbyterians
Scottish solicitors
United Farmers of Alberta MLAs
Members of the Executive Council of Alberta
Canadian King's Counsel